Neal James Buckon, (September 3, 1953) is an American prelate of the Roman Catholic Church who has been serving as an auxiliary bishop of the Archdiocese for the Military Services, USA since 2011.

Biography
Neal Buckon was born on September 3, 1953, in Columbus, Ohio. He studied at Saint Mary's Seminary in Cleveland, Ohio.  Buckon was ordained a priest by Bishop Anthony Michael Pilla for the Diocese of Cleveland on May 25, 1995.

Buckon was appointed as an auxiliary bishop  of the Archdiocese for the Military Services, USA as well as titular bishop of Vissalsa on January 3, 2011, by Pope Benedict XVI.  Buckon was consecrated by Bishop Timothy Broglio on February 22, 2011.

See also

 Catholic Church hierarchy
 Catholic Church in the United States
 Historical list of the Catholic bishops of the United States
 Insignia of Chaplain Schools in the US Military
 List of Catholic bishops of the United States
 List of Catholic bishops of the United States: military service
 Lists of patriarchs, archbishops, and bishops
 Military chaplain
 Religious symbolism in the United States military
 United States military chaplains

References

External links

 Archdiocese for the Military Services, USA Official Website
 Archdiocese for the Military Services of the United States. GCatholic.org. Retrieved 2010-08-20.
Catholic-Hierarchy

Episcopal succession
 

 

21st-century American Roman Catholic titular bishops
1953 births
Living people
American military chaplains
Chaplains